Totanes may refer to:
Totanés, Toledo, Spain
Totanes (surname)